The Port Terminal Railroad Association is an American terminal railroad that operates  of track at the Port of Houston in Houston, Texas. It is an independent association comprising Port of Houston Authority, the Houston Belt & Terminal Railway, Union Pacific Railroad, BNSF Railway and Kansas City Southern Railway.

References

Switching and terminal railroads
Texas railroads
Union Pacific Railroad
BNSF Railway